John Grant Gibson (born 12 November 1948) is a New Zealand former cricketer. He played first-class and List A matches for Auckland and Northern Districts between 1969 and 1981. An opening and middle-order batsman, Gibson made his highest score of 128 for Northern Districts against Auckland in 1977–78.

See also
 List of Auckland representative cricketers

References

External links
 

1948 births
Living people
New Zealand cricketers
Auckland cricketers
Northern Districts cricketers
Cricketers from Hamilton, New Zealand